This is a list of people and other topics appearing on the cover of Time magazine in the 1940s. Time was first published in 1923. As Time became established as one of the United States' leading news magazines, an appearance on the cover of Time became an indicator of a person's notability, fame or notoriety. Such features were accompanied by articles.

For other decades, see Lists of covers of Time magazine.

1940

January 1 –  Joseph Stalin, Man of the Year
January 8 –  Cordell Hull
January 15 –  Viscount Halifax
January 22 –  Lauritz Melchior
January 29 –  Robert A. Taft
February 5 –  Baron Mannerheim
February 12 –  Ève Curie
February 19 –  John H. Levi
February 26 –  Thomas E. Dewey
March 4 –  Mitsumasa Yonai
March 11 –  Jerome Frank
March 18 –  Mickey Rooney
March 25 –  Éamon de Valera
April 1 –  Hermann Göring
April 8 –  Benito Mussolini
April 15 –  Burton K. Wheeler
April 22 –  Dudley Pound
April 29 –  King Gustaf V & Crown Prince Gustaf Adolf
May 6 –  Joseph N. Pew, Jr.
May 13 –  Nikolaus von Falkenhorst
May 20 –  King Leopold III 
May 27 –  Arthur Barratt &  Patrick Playfair
June 3 –  Maxime Weygand
June 10 –  Franklin D. Roosevelt
June 17 –  Paul Reynaud with  Maxime Weygand, Paul Baudouin and Philippe Pétain
June 24 –  Benito Mussolini &  Pietro Badoglio
July 1 –  Admiral Richardson
July 8 –  Philip Henry Kerr
July 15 –  Vyacheslav Molotov
July 22 –  Fumimaro Konoe
July 29 –  George Marshall
August 5 –  Sir Alan F. Brooke
August 12 –  Getúlio Vargas
August 19 –  William Allen White
August 26 –  Erhard Milch
September 2 –  Earl of Athlone & his wife Princess Alice
September 9 –  Joe Martin
September 16 –  Baron Beaverbrook
September 23 –  Henry A. Wallace
September 30 –  Winston Churchill
October 7 –  William S. Knudsen
October 14 –  Archibald Wavell, 1st Earl Wavell
October 21 –  Wendell Willkie
October 28 –  Ethel Merman
November 4 –  King George II 
November 11 –  Thomas Holcomb
November 18 –   Leopold Stokowski
November 25 –  Kenneth Roberts
December 2 –  Sidney Hillman
December 9 –  Manuel Ávila Camacho
December 16 –  Alexander Papagos
December 23 –  Martin Niemöller
December 30 –   Lily Pons

1941

January 6 –  Winston Churchill, Man of the Year
January 13 –  Jesse Jones
January 20 –  King Boris III 
January 27 –  Philip Murray
February 3 –  Gertrude Lawrence
February 10 –   Anton J. Carlson
February 17 –  Andrew Cunningham
February 24 –  Donald M. Nelson
March 3 –  Gary Cooper
March 10 –  Gaston Henry-Haye
March 17 –  Henry Ford
March 24 –  Wilhelm List
March 31 –  Emory Scott Land
April 7 –  Bing Crosby
April 14 –  Adolf Hitler
April 21 –  Dušan Simović
April 28 –  Sir Percy Noble
May 5 –  Ramon S. Castillo
May 12 –  Leon Henderson
May 19 –  İsmet İnönü
May 26 –  François Darlan
Jun 2 -  Ernest King
Jun 9 -  Benito Mussolini
June 16 –  Chen Cheng
June 23 –  Jack Towers
June 30 –  Semyon Timoshenko
July 7 –  Yosuke Matsuoka
July 14 –  Wilhelm Keitel
July 21 –  Claude Wickard
July 28 –  Sir Charles Portal
August 4 –  Charles de Gaulle
August 11 –  Sumner Welles
August 18 –  Hubertus J. van Mook
August 25 –  Henry L. Stimson
September 1 –  Frank Maxwell Andrews
September 8 –  Reza Shah Pahlavi
September 15 –  Harold L. Ickes
September 22 –  Kichisaburō Nomura
September 29 –  Joe Louis
October 6 –  Robert E. Wood
October 13 –  Semyon Budyonny
October 20 –  Frederick Bowhill
October 27 –  Joseph Stalin
November 3 –  Hideki Tōjō
November 10 –  Rita Hayworth
November 17 –  Reuben Fleet
November 24 –  Thomas C. Hart
December 1 –  Sir Claude Auchinleck
December 8 –  Fedor von Bock
December 15 –  Husband E. Kimmel
December 22 –  Isoroku Yamamoto
December 29 –  Douglas MacArthur

1942

January 5 –  Franklin D. Roosevelt, Man of the Year
January 12 –  Henry Royds Pownall
January 19 –  Oswaldo Aranha
January 26 –  Hein ter Poorten
February 2 –  Karl Dönitz
February 9 –  Robert A. Lovett
February 16 –  Boris Shaposhnikov
February 23 –   Reinhard Heydrich
March 2 –  Tomoyuki Yamashita
March 9 –  Conrad Emil Lambert Helfrich
March 16 –  Lord Linlithgow
March 23 –  Henry Ford
March 30 –  Douglas MacArthur
April 6 –  Ezequiel Padilla
April 13 –  Sir Stafford Cripps
April 20 –  Erich Raeder
April 27 –  Pierre Laval
May 4 –  Lewis H. Brereton
May 11 –  Maxim Litvinoff
May 18 –  Chester Nimitz
May 25 –  Draža Mihailović
June 1 –  Chiang Kai-shek
June 8 –  Lord Louis Mountbatten
June 15 –  Brehon B. Somervell
June 22 –  Henry 'Hap' Arnold
June 29 –  Franz Halder
July 6 –  Flag of the United States
July 13 –  Erwin Rommel
July 20 –  Dmitri Shostakovich
July 27 –  Semyon Timoshenko
August 3 –  Seishirō Itagaki
August 10 –  General McNaughton
August 17 –  Robert L. Ghormley
August 24 –  Jawaharlal Nehru
August 31 –  Gerd von Rundstedt
September 7 –  Frank Knox
September 14 –   Harold Alexander
September 21 –  Fedor von Bock
September 28 –  William Francis Gibbs
October 5 –  Paul V. McNutt
October 12 –  Edward J. Flynn
October 19 –  George C. Marshall
October 26 –  Viscount Gort
November 2 –  General Vandegrift
November 9 –  Sir Arthur Tedder
November 16 –  Dwight D. Eisenhower
November 23 –  James H. Doolittle
November 30 –  William Halsey, Jr.
December 7 –  Ernest J. King
December 14 –  Georgy Zhukov
December 21 –  Katharine Cornell,  Judith Anderson &  Ruth Gordon
December 28 –  Lesley J. McNair

1943

January 4 –  Joseph Stalin, Man of the Year
January 11 –  James F. Byrnes
January 18 –  George Kenney
January 25 –  Henry Morgenthau Jr.
February 1 –  Bernard Montgomery
February 8 –  Anthony Eden
February 15 –  Osami Nagano
February 22 –  Filipp Golikov
March 1 –  Madame Chiang Kai-shek
March 8 –  Harry S. Truman
March 15 –  Elmer Davis
March 22 –  Carl Andrew Spaatz
March 29 –  Henri Giraud
April 5 –  Sir Thomas Beecham
April 12 –  George S. Patton
April 19 –  Manuel Ávila Camacho
April 26 –  John W. Bricker
May 3 –  Kenneth Anderson
May 10 –  Karl Dönitz
May 17 –  Harold Lee George
May 24 –  Sir Andrew Cunningham
May 31 –  Gustaf VI Adolf
June 7 –  Sir Arthur Harris
June 14 –  Harold D. Smith
June 21 –  Benito Mussolini
June 28 –  Bernard Baruch
July 5 –  Aleksandr Vasilevsky
July 12 –  Şükrü Saracoğlu
July 19 –  Walter F. George
July 26 –  George S. Patton
August 2 –  Ingrid Bergman
August 9 –  Terry de la Mesa Allen Sr.
August 16 –   Pius XII
August 23 –  Konstantin Rokossovsky
August 30 –  General Ira Eaker
September 6 –  Paul Hoffman
September 13 –  Dwight D. Eisenhower
September 20 –   Bob Hope
September 27 –  Sam Rayburn
October 4 –  Mark W. Clark
October 11 –  Heinrich Himmler
October 18 –  Francisco Franco
October 25 –  Vyacheslav Molotov
November 1 –  Thomas E. Dewey
November 8 –  Mineichi Koga
November 15 –  John J. Pershing
November 22 –  Donald W. Douglas
November 29 –  Franklin D. Roosevelt
December 6 –  Claire L. Chennault
December 13 –  Charles Edward Wilson
December 20 –   Greer Garson
December 27 –  Sergius I

1944

January 3 –  George Marshall, Man of the Year
January 10 –  Erich von Manstein
January 17 –  Oveta Culp Hobby
January 24 –   Jimmy Durante
January 31 –  Earl Warren
February 7 –  Richmond K. Turner
February 14 –  Harrison E. Spangler
February 21 –  Holland Smith
February 28 –  Henry Maitland Wilson, 1st Baron Wilson
March 6 –  King George VI 
March 13 –  Tom Connally
March 20 –  Nikolai Voronov
March 27 –  Jan Masaryk
April 3 –  Vannevar Bush
April 10 –  Leverett Saltonstall
April 17 –  Cyril Garbett
April 24 –  John Curtin
May 1 –  Omar Bradley
May 8 –  Jonathan Mayhew Wainwright IV
May 15 –  Alexander Fleming
May 22 –   Jan C. Smuts
May 29 –  Charles de Gaulle
June 5 –  Sir Harold Alexander
June 12 –  Carl Andrew Spaatz
June 19 –  Dwight D. Eisenhower
June 26 –  Raymond A. Spruance
July 3 –  Shigetarō Shimada
July 10 –  Bernard Law Montgomery, 1st Viscount Montgomery of Alamein
July 17 –  Ernie Pyle
July 24 –  Sidney Hillman
July 31 –  Alexander Novikov
August 7 –  Heinz Guderian
August 14 –   Arthur Coningham
August 21 –  Gerd von Rundstedt
August 28 –  Alexander Patch
September 4 – Liberation of Paris
September 11 –  Leroy Randle Grumman
September 18 –  Harry Crerar
September 25 –  John C. H. Lee
October 2 –  Van Wyck Brooks
October 9 –  Josip Broz Tito
October 16 –  Courtney Hodges
October 23 –  Thomas E. Dewey
October 30 –  Douglas MacArthur
November 6 –  Harry S. Truman
November 13 –  Joseph Stilwell
November 20 –  Edgar Bergen
November 27 –  Juan Perón
December 4 –  Omar Bradley
December 11 –  Edward R. Stettinius, Jr.
December 18 –  Tse-veng Soong
December 25 –  Eivind Berggrav

1945

January 1 –  Dwight D. Eisenhower, Man of the Year
January 8 –  Anita Colby
January 15 –  Hoyt Vandenberg
January 22 –  Harry Hopkins
January 29 –  Walter Krueger
February 5 –  Joseph Stalin
February 12 –  Heinrich Himmler
February 19 –  William Hood Simpson
February 26 –  Chester W. Nimitz
March 5 –  Abdulaziz al-Saud 
March 12 –  Mildred H. McAfee
March 19 –  Sir Miles C. Dempsey
March 26 –  Lord Woolton
April 2 –  Matthew Ridgway
April 9 –  George S. Patton
April 16 –  Simon Bolivar Buckner, Jr.
April 23 –  Harry S. Truman
April 30 –  Arthur H. Vandenberg
May 7 –  Adolf Hitler
May 14 – The Big Three ( Joseph Stalin,  Winston Churchill &  Franklin D. Roosevelt)
May 21 –  Emperor Hirohito
May 28 –  William D. Leahy
June 4 –  Albert Coady Wedemeyer
June 11 –  Robert Evans Woods
June 18 – Bill Maudin's "Willie"
June 25 –  Lucius D. Clay
July 2 –  Mel Ott
July 9 –  Fred M. Vinson
July 16 –  Lord Wavell
July 23 –  William Halsey, Jr.
July 30 –  William Martin Jeffers 
August 6 –  Clement Attlee
August 13 –  Curtis LeMay
August 20 – Fall of Japan
August 27 –  Douglas MacArthur
September 3 –  Chiang Kai-shek
September 10 –  Robert L. Eichelberger
September 17 –  James F. Byrnes
September 24 –  Alfred P. Sloan
October 1 –  Archbishop Damaskinos
October 8 –  Sinclair Lewis
October 15 –  Lewis Schwellenbach
October 22 –  Edvard Beneš
October 29 –  James V. Forrestal
November 5 –  Spruille Braden
November 12 –  Glenn Davis &  Doc Blanchard
November 19 –  Sergei Prokofiev
November 26 –  H. T. Webster
December 3 –  Walter Reuther
December 10 – Nuremberg Trials
December 17 –  Mohammed Reza Pahlavi
December 24 – The Nativity
December 31 –  Harry S. Truman, Man of the Year

1946

January 7 –  William Lyon Mackenzie King
January 14 –  Robert E. Gross
January 21 –  Philip Murray
January 28 –  Craig Rice
February 4 –  Henry Ford II
February 11 –  Stanislaw Mikolajczyk
February 18 –  Ernest Bevin
February 25 –  Cardinal Spellman
March 4 –  Chester Bliss Bowles
March 11 –  Danny Kaye & Sylvia Fine
March 18 –  Francisco Franco
March 25 –  George C. Marshall
April 1 –  Omar Bradley
April 8 –  Laurence Olivier
April 15 –   Amadeo Peter Giannini
April 22 –  Muhammad Ali Jinnah
April 29 –  Gustav T. Kuester
May 6 –   Elizabeth Arden
May 13 –  Queen Wilhelmina 
May 20 –  John L. Lewis
May 27 –  Edward H. Crump
June 3 –  Maurice Thorez
June 10 –  Charles Luckman
June 17 –  Joseph Curran
June 24 –  Mark W. Clark
July 1 –   Albert Einstein
July 8 –  Manuel A. Roxas
July 15 –  Roger D. Lapham
July 22 –  Antonio Salazar
July 29 –  Herbert Morrison
August 5 –  Camillien Houde
August 12 –  George E. Allen
August 19 –  Viacheslav Molotov
August 26 – Jerusalem
September 2 –  Pauline Betz
September 9 –  Jo Davidson
September 16 –  Josip Broz Tito
September 23 –  James Bryant Conant
September 30 –  Henry A. Wallace
October 7 –  Victor Emanuel 
October 14 –  Frank Leahy
October 21 –  Eugene O'Neill
October 28 –  Edward Martin
November 4 –  Charles Francis Adams III
November 11 –  Helen Traubel
November 18 –  Joseph William Martin, Jr.
November 25 –  Trygve Lie
December 2 –  George Messersmith
December 9 –  Andrei Zhdanov
December 16 –  John L. Lewis
December 23 –  Sukarno
December 30 –  Marian Anderson

1947

January 6 –  James F. Byrnes, Man of the Year
January 13 –  Milton Caniff
January 20 –  Robert A. Taft
January 27 –  Vallabhbhai Patel
February 3 –  Robert R. Young
February 10 –  Deborah Kerr
February 17 –  Artur Rodziński
February 24 –  King George II
March 3 –  Joseph H. Ball
March 10 –  George C. Marshall
March 17 –  Arnold J. Toynbee
March 24 –  Eugene Holman
March 31 –  Princess Elizabeth
April 7 –  Fred Allen
April 14 –  Leo Durocher
April 21 –  William A. Patterson
April 28 –  Miguel Alemán
May 5 –  Palmiro Togliatti
May 12 –  Arthur H. Vandenberg
May 19 –  J. Arthur Rank
May 26 –  Chen Li-Fu
June 2 –  Billy Rose
June 9 –  Robert McCormick
June 16 –  Ernest Gruening
June 23 –  Dwight D. Eisenhower
June 30 –  Mohandas Gandhi
July 7 –  Marlin Perkins
July 14 –  Eva Perón
July 21 –  George Albert Smith
July 28 –  Hedda Hopper
August 4 –  David Lilienthal
August 11 –  Captain Illingworth 
August 18 –  Andrei Gromyko
August 25 –  Harold Stassen
September 1 –  Jake Kramer
September 8 –  C.S. Lewis
September 15 –  Sophie Gimbel
September 22 –  Jackie Robinson
September 29 –  Andrei Vishinsky
October 6 –  Robert Gordon Sproul
October 13 –  William Green
October 20 –  Oscar Hammerstein II
October 27 – India
November 3 –  Robert A. Chappuis
November 10 –  Sir Stafford Cripps
November 17 –  Charles de Gaulle
November 24 –  deLesseps S. Morrison
December 1 –  Lewis Douglas
December 8 –  Rebecca West
December 15 –  Robert J. Kleberg, Jr.
December 22 –  Joseph Farrington
December 29 – Madonna and Child by Alesso Baldovinetti

1948

January 5 –  George C. Marshall, Man of the Year
January 12 –  Gregory Peck
January 19 –  W. Stuart Symington
January 26 –  James Caesar Petrillo
February 2 –  Barbara Ann Scott
February 9 –  Edwin P. Hubble
February 16 –  Benjamin Britten
February 23 –  Karl Marx
March 1 –   Robert Schuman
March 8 –  Reinhold Niebuhr
March 15 –  Clark Clifford
March 22 –  Lavrenty Beria
March 29 –  Robert A. Lovett
April 5 –  Markos Vafiades
April 12 –  Roy A. Roberts
April 19 –  Alcide de Gasperi
April 26 –  Arturo Toscanini
May 3 –  George Gallup
May 10 –  Paul-Henri Spaak
May 17 –  Eddie Arcaro
May 24 –  Abdullah I 
May 31 –  Augustus E. John
June 7 –  William O'Dwyer
June 14 – Wall Street Bull
June 21 –  James H. Duff
June 28 –  Jean Simmons
July 5 –  Thomas E. Dewey
July 12 –  Lucius D. Clay
July 19 –  Howard Hughes
July 26 –   Igor Stravinsky
August 2 –  Mel Patton
August 9 –  Henry A. Wallace
August 16 –  David Ben-Gurion
August 23 –  Betty Grable
August 30 –  Earl Long
September 6 –  Queen Juliana 
September 13 –  Garfield Bromley Oxnam
September 20 –  Ana Pauker
September 27 –  Earl Warren
October 4 –  Joe DiMaggio
October 11 –  J. Strom Thurmond
October 18 –  Douglas Freeman
October 25 –  William C. Menninger
November 1 – Election, U.S.A
November 8 –  Robert Oppenheimer
November 15 –  Anastasio Somoza
November 22 –  Tallulah Bankhead
November 29 –  Dave Beck
December 6 –  Chiang Kai-shek
December 13 –  Drew Pearson
December 20 –   Olivia de Havilland
December 27 – Christmas Eve

1949

January 3 –  Harry S. Truman, Man of the Year
January 10 –  Ben Hogan
January 17 –  Hubert Humphrey
January 24 –  Charles E. Wilson
January 31 –  Cole Porter
February 7 –  Mao Zedong
February 14 –  József Mindszenty
February 21 –  Louis Armstrong
February 28 –  Dean Acheson
March 7 –  John P. Marquand
March 14 –  Perle Mesta
March 21 –  Aneurin Bevan
March 28 –  Juan Trippe
April 4 –  Diego Rivera
April 11 –  Paul G. Hoffman
April 18 –  Chuck Yeager
April 25 –  Eugene Dennis
May 2 –  Luis Muñoz Marín
May 9 –  Douglas MacArthur
May 16 –  Milton Berle
May 23 –  James Van Fleet
May 30 –  Ben A. Jones
June 6 –  Louis A. Johnson
June 13 –  Princess Margaret
June 20 –  John Jay McCloy
June 27 –  Cornelius P. Rhoads
July 4 –  Fletcher Bowron
July 11 –   Albert Schweitzer
July 18 –  King Leopold III &   Princess de Rethy
July 25 –  Harold Lloyd
August 1 –  General de Tassigny
August 8 –  J. Edgar Hoover
August 15 –   Richard Neutra
August 22 –   Elizabeth Taylor
August 29 –   David Dubinsky
September 5 –   Stan Musial
September 12 –  Louis St. Laurent
September 19 –  Lisa Fonssagrives
September 26 –  Sir Oliver Franks
October 3 –  Richard K. Mellon
October 10 –  Margaret Clapp
October 17 –  Jawaharlal Nehru
October 24 –  Harold Medina
October 31 –   Raymond Loewy
November 7 –   Selman Waksman
November 14 –  Margot Fonteyn
November 21 –  Robert M. Hutchins
November 28 –   Frank Costello
December 5 –  Konrad Adenauer
December 12 –  Conrad N. Hilton
December 19 –  Charles Munch
December 26 –  Ernest I. Pugmire

References

 Time The Vault

Time magazine (1940s)
1940s
Cover of Time magazine